Alhaji Mohammed (born October 29, 1981) is an American-born Ghanaian former basketball player. A four year college basketball player for Louisville, he started his 17-year long professional career in 2004.

Career
From 2008 to 2010, Mohammed played with Limoges CSP of the French LNB Pro A and was inducted into the team's Hall of Fame.

For the 2014–15 season he chose to stay with his Romanian team Asesoft Ploiești. On February 13, he left the club by mutual agreement, making him a free agent. On February 26, 2015, he signed with SLUC Nancy Basket for the rest of the season.

On September 22, 2015, he signed with Sigal Prishtina. On November 17, 2015, he left Prishtina and moved to the Romanian club BC Mureș. On February 3, 2017, he left Mureș and signed with Hungarian club Alba Fehérvár.

In February, Mohammed signed in Tunisia with US Monastir. With Monastir, he was to play in the inaugural season of the Basketball Africa League. However, the season was cancelled due to the COVID-19 pandemic and Mohammed never joined Monastir.

In October 2021, he retired from basketball after making the announcement at his 40th birthday.

Personal 
Alhaji is one of 11 children born to parents Ayisha Ali and Alhaji T. Mohammed. His brother Nazr Mohammed is a famous player in the NBA for more the 15 years. In 2000 his dad was killed in his auto parts store in Chicago. On Alhaji right arm, he has tattooed the image of his father with the words "Flesh of my flesh/Blood of my blood" as a sign of love, respect and appreciation.

References

External links
 Eurobasket.com Profile
 FIBA.com Profile

1981 births
Living people
Alba Fehérvár players
American expatriate basketball people in France
American expatriate basketball people in Germany
American expatriate basketball people in Hungary
American expatriate basketball people in Iran
American expatriate basketball people in Kosovo
American expatriate basketball people in Romania
American expatriate basketball people in Spain
American expatriate basketball people in the Netherlands
American men's basketball players
Ghanaian men's basketball players
Basketball players from Chicago
CB Valladolid players
CS Universitatea Cluj-Napoca (men's basketball) players
CSU Asesoft Ploiești players
Idaho Stampede (CBA) players
KB Prishtina players
Liga ACB players
Limoges CSP players
Louisville Cardinals men's basketball players
Matrixx Magixx players
Paderborn Baskets players
SLUC Nancy Basket players
Small forwards
Ventura Pirates men's basketball players